Events from the year 1793 in Sweden

Incumbents
 Monarch – Gustav IV Adolf

Events
 7 January - Ebel riots in Stockholm. 
 9 March - Riot among students in Scania. 
 May - Reuterholm completes a defense treaty with revolutionary France. 
 18 December - Magdalena Rudenschöld is the first to be arrested when the Armfelt Conspiracy of the Gustavian Party against the guardian government is exposed.  
 - The Royal Dramatic Theatre changes localities from the Bollhuset to Makalös in Stockholm, and the Bollhuset building is torn down. 
 - The Royal Dramatic Training Academy is regulated and given its organization by Anne Marie Milan Desguillons and Joseph Sauze Desguillons.

Births
 27 February - Elisabeth Frösslind, opera singer and actress  (died 1861)
 20 August - Ulrika Sofia De Geer, salonnière (died 1869)
 14 October - Erik Johan Stagnelius, romantic poet  (died 1823)
 28 November - Carl Jonas Love Almqvist,  romantic poet, early feminist, realist, composer, social critic and traveller  (died 1866)
 2 September - Caroline Ridderstolpe, composer (died 1878)

Deaths
 4 January - Bengt Lidner, poet  (born 1757)
 2 March – Carl Gustaf Pilo, painter (born 1711)
 15 May - Peter Adolf Hall, painter (born 1739)
 19 May – Jean Eric Rehn
 5 July - Alexander Roslin, painter (born 1718)
 10 August - Daniel Rolander,  biologist and an apostle of Carl Linnaeus (born 1722)
 Maria Carowsky, painter (born 1723)
 Ingrid Maria Wenner, courtier  (born 1731)

References

 
Years of the 18th century in Sweden
Sweden